Jeff Cardwell is an American politician from the state of Indiana. A member of the Republican Party, he previously served as Chairman of the Indiana Republican Party. Cardwell ran for the Indianapolis City-County Council in 2007 and won. He replaced Phil Borst. He won reelection in 2011 and served on the City Council until January 7, 2013. He previously served as a Senior Advisor to then Governor Mike Pence from January 14, 2013 to March 31, 2015.

References

External links
Our Campaigns – Jeff Cardwell (IN) profile

Indiana Republicans
State political party chairs of Indiana
Indiana Wesleyan University alumni
Living people
1959 births
Indianapolis City-County Council members